José Antonio Garrido Lima (born November 28, 1975 in Barakaldo, Basque Country) is a Spanish professional road bicycle racer and guitar player. He currently rides for the UCI ProTour team Quick Step-Innergetic. Since turning professional in 1999, Garrido has achieved several top ten placings in Spanish stage races, including a fourth place, and wins in the combination competition and of stage 2, in the 2003 Clásica de Alcobendas. He recently joined the Portuguese LA MSS - Póvoa do Varzim. He was also the rhythm guitarist of Spanish band Dark Moor during their self-titled album.

Palmarès 

2000 – Benfica
Volta a Portugal
Stage 8 - winner
2001 – Jazztel-Costa de Almeria
Vuelta a Burgos
Metas Volantes competition - winner
2002 – Jazztel-Costa de Almeria
Volta a Catalunya
Overall - 10th
2003 – Paternina-Costa de Almeria
Clásica de Alcobendas
Overall - 4th
Stage 2 - winner
Combination competition - winner
Vuelta a Castilla y León
Overall - 6th
Vuelta Asturias
Overall - 9th

External links 
Eurosport Profile
Palmarès

1975 births
Living people
Cyclists from the Basque Country (autonomous community)
Spanish male cyclists
Sportspeople from Barakaldo
Basque musicians
Spanish guitarists